Kuban Krasnodar was an ice hockey team in Krasnodar, Russia. They played in the VHL, the second level of Russian ice hockey until 2015. It was founded in 2012 and became affiliated with HC Sochi of the KHL since the inaugural season.

Gallery

References

External links
Official site

Kuban
Sports clubs in Krasnodar
Kuban
2012 establishments in Russia
Ice hockey clubs disestablished in 2015